"Gonna Get This" is a pop song by American singer-songwriter and actress  Miley Cyrus, performing as Hannah Montana – the alter ego of Miley Stewart – a character she plays on the Disney Channel television series Hannah Montana. It also features vocals from R&B singer Iyaz.  The song is musically dance-pop based. The song was later released on October 5, 2010 as the third single from the soundtrack of the same title as the special title (Hannah Montana Forever) of the fourth and final season of the series.

Background and composition

"Gonna Get This" was written by Niclas Molinder, Joacim Persson, Johan Alkenas, and Drew Ryan Scott. Released on October 5, 2010 as the third single from the album. It is featured in the eighth episode of Hannah Montana Forever, titled "Hannah's Gonna Get This"; Iyaz guest stars in the episode, where he and Hannah are shown recording the song in a studio.

Fans previously called it "This Boy, That Girl" when the song leaked onto the internet in early 2010.

Reception
Although the song has not been commented on in any official reviews, the song was chosen as one of the top tracks according to the Allmusic Guide.

The song debuted at thirty-six on the US Hot Digital Songs chart for the week ending November 6, 2010, which led to a debut at no. 66 on Billboards US Hot 100.

Music video

Unlike other Hannah Montana music videos, "Gonna Get This" is not a concert taping performance. It features Cyrus dressed as Hannah Montana and Iyaz singing in a recording studio. All of the footage from the song are taken from the Hannah Montana Forever episode "Hannah's Gonna Get This". There are also special effects of Rico dancing and some of the lyrics flashing across the screen.

Track listings
iTunes exclusive single
"Gonna Get This" (Album Version) – 3:18

Charts

References

2010 songs
Hannah Montana songs
Iyaz songs
Walt Disney Records singles
Songs from television series
Songs written by Niclas Molinder
Songs written by Joacim Persson
Song recordings produced by Twin (production team)
Songs written by Johan Alkenäs
Songs written by Drew Ryan Scott